Jean-Marie Pelt (24 October 1933 – 23 December 2015) was a French biologist, botanist and pharmacist with degrees in both biology and pharmacy.

He was professor at the University of Lorraine, specializing in medicinal plants and traditional pharmacopeia, and is the author of several scientific articles and books on pharmaceutical plants, plant biology and urban ecology. Pelt was known to the French public as the producer of several television series and radio broadcasts on plant biology and ecology. He has been nicknamed the Konrad Lorenz of the vegetable world.

Scientific works
Through his academic career, Pelt studied the science of medicinal plants, phytopharmacology, phytotherapy, and phytotoxicology. He specifically focused on the repertories of drugs and medicinal plants of Afghanistan, Chile, Europe, and Yemen.

Institutional roles
In addition to his research work at the University of Nancy and more recently the University of Lorraine, Pelt founded the European Institute of Ecology in 1972 and co-founded the French Society of Ethnopharmacology in 1987 and the Committee of Independent Research and Information on the Genetic Engineering in 1999. Along with Simone Veil, Jacques Delors or Corinne Lepage, Pelt was a fellow member of the Committee 21, the French deliberative assembly for the environment and sustainable development which is in charge of implementing the Agenda 21 action plan.

Urban ecology concepts and applications

As municipal councilor of Metz between 1971 and 1983, Pelt pioneered a policy of urban ecology. Because of the failure in post-war urban planning and housing estates occurring in Europe during the 1960s, and gathering inspiration from the concepts of CIAM, Professor Pelt initiated a new approach towards the urban environment. He developed his ideas on this topic in The Re-Naturalized Human, a pioneering book from 1977 which was awarded the European Prize of Ecology.

Based on the ideas of the Chicago School, Pelt's theories advocated for a better integration of humans into their environment and developed a concept concerning the relation between "stones and waters". His ideas were materialized in Metz with the establishment of extensive open areas surrounding the Moselle and the Seille rivers and the development of large areas for walking. He died on 23 December 2015.

Bibliography 
  The medications (1969), Ed. Le Seuil.  
  Evolution and sexuality in plants (1970), Eds. Horizons de France . 
  The re-naturalized Human (1977), Eds. Le Seuil.  - European Prize of Ecology
  Plants: loves and vegetable civilizations (1980), Eds. Fayard. ASIN B005P797KM
  Medicine by the plants (1981,1986), Eds. Fayard 
  The tremendous adventure of the plants (1981), Eds. Fayard 
  Drugs and magic plants (1971,1980), (1983), Eds. Fayard 
  Drugs, their history, their effects (1983), Eds. Fayard  
  The social life of the plants (1984), Eds. Fayard
  My most beautiful stories about plants (1986), Eds. Le Seuil
  Flowers, celebrations, and seasons (1986), Eds. Fayard
  The pedestrian of Metz with Christian Legay (1988), Eds. Serpenoise
  Around the work of an ecologist (1990), Eds. Fayard
  At the back of my garden (1992), Eds. Fayard
  The child of the possible (1992), Eds. Albin Michel
  Vegetables (1993), Eds. Fayard
  The plants' world (1993), collection Petit Point, Eds. Seuil
  A lesson of nature (1993), Eds. l'Esprit du temps
  Fruits (1994), Eds. Fayard
  Universe's God, science and faith (1995), Eds. Fayard
  Words of nature (1995), Eds. Albin Michel
  The secrete languages of the nature (1996), Eds. Fayard
  From the universe to the Being (1996), Eds. Fayard
  The plants in danger (1997), Eds. Fayard
  The soul's garden (1998), Eds. Fayard
  The most beautiful story about plants with M. Mazoyer, Théodore Monod, and J. Giradon (1999), Eds. Le Seuil
  The cinnamon and the panda (1999), Eds. Fayard
  The Earth in inheritance (2000), Eds. Fayard
  Variation on celebrations and seasons (2000), Eds. Le Pommier
  Listening the trees (2000), Eds. Albin Michel
  The life is my garden (2000), Eds. Alice, Belgique
  The new natural remedies (2001), Eds. Fayard
  Spices (2002), Eds. Fayard
  The future straight in the eyes (2002), Eds. Fayard
  The law of the jungle with Franck Steffan (2003), Eds. Fayard
  Solidarity in plants, animals, and humans (2004), Eds. Fayard
  Virtues of the plants, pictures of Peter Lippmann (2004), Eds. Chêne
  Around the world of an ecologist, once again (2005), Eds. Fayard
  Those plants we are eating (2006), Eds. Chêne
  After us, the Deluge? with Gilles-Éric Séralini (2006), Eds. Flammarion/Fayard
  Ecology and spirituality collective work (2006), Eds. Albin Michel
  It's green and it's walking with Franck Steffan (2007), Eds. Fayard
  Beauty of flowers and decorative plants (2007), Eds. Chêne
  Nature and spirituality (2008), Eds. Fayard
  Le monde s'est-il créé tout seul ? with Albert Jacquard, Trinh Xuan Thuan, Ilya Prigogine, and Joël De Rosnay (2008), Eds. Albin Michel
  The reason of the weakest with Franck Steffan (2009), Eds. Fayard
  Little story of plants: the diary of a committed botanist (2009), Eds. Carnets Nord
  The precious gifts of the nature (2010), Eds. Fayard
  The paths of happiness (2010), Eds. de la Martinière
  Evolution as seen by a botanist (2011), Eds. Fayard

References

20th-century French botanists
French environmentalists
1933 births
2015 deaths
French pharmacologists
Officiers of the Légion d'honneur
Officers of the Ordre national du Mérite
Academic staff of the University of Lorraine
University of Lorraine alumni
People from Moselle (department)
21st-century French botanists